Petlovac is a village and municipality in the western part of Baranja, which comprise the northern part of Osijek-Baranja County in Croatia. Petlovac is underdeveloped municipality which is statistically classified as the First Category Area of Special State Concern by the Government of Croatia.

Until the end of World War II, the majority of the Inhabitants was Danube Swabians, also called locally as Stifolder, because there Ancestors once came at the 17th century and 18th century from Fulda (district). Mostly of the former German Settlers was expelled to Allied-occupied Germany and Allied-occupied Austria in 1945-1948, about the Potsdam Agreement.

Name

Its name derived from the word "petao" (which means "rooster" in English).

Municipality of Petlovac

Population

Municipality of Petlovac has 2,405 inhabitants (2011 census), including: 
73.22% Croats
13.72% Hungarians
5.07% Serbs
4.53% Romani

Geography

It is located between border with Hungary in the north-west, Baranja municipalities of Beli Manastir and Jagodnjak in the east and Slavonia region in the south-west.

The municipality of Petlovac include following settlements:
Petlovac
Baranjsko Petrovo Selo
Luč
Novi Bezdan
Novo Nevesinje
Sudaraž
Širine
Torjanci
Zeleno Polje

Petlovac (settlement)

History

Till 1991. part of settlement was Zeleno Polje which is now independent settlement.

Population

Ethnic composition, 1991. census

Austria-Hungary 1910. census

 In 1910. census together with settlement Zeleno Polje.

References

Literature

 Book: "Narodnosni i vjerski sastav stanovništva Hrvatske, 1880–1991: po naseljima, autor: Jakov Gelo, izdavač: Državni zavod za statistiku Republike Hrvatske, 1998., ;

Populated places in Osijek-Baranja County
Municipalities of Croatia
Baranya (region)